The Yogi (German: Der Yoghi) is a 1916 German silent drama film directed by Rochus Gliese and Paul Wegener and starring Wegener and Lyda Salmonova. Wegener plays a double role as an inventor and an Indian mystic.

It was shot at the Tempelhof Studios in Berlin. The film's sets were designed by Rochus Gliese.

Cast
Paul Wegener as The Yogi / The Inventor 
Lyda Salmonova as Myra 
Hedwig Gutzeit
Fritz Huf as Gott Schiwa

References

External links

Films of the German Empire
German silent feature films
Films directed by Paul Wegener
Films directed by Rochus Gliese
German drama films
1916 drama films
Films shot at Tempelhof Studios
Films about invisibility
German black-and-white films
Silent drama films
1910s German films
1910s German-language films